The Shauka people are Tibeto-Burman ethnic group living in the Johar Valley of Gori Ganga river in Munsyari, tehsil of the Pithoragarh District in  Kumaon, India.

See also
Kumaon
Kumauni people

Further reading 
 "Zu einer Zeit, als Bäume und Gräser noch sprechen konnten...". Sozioökonomie, Kosmologie und Mythologie der Rang-Shauka im zentralindischen Himalaya (Taschenbuch) von Sabine Leder
 History of the Origin of Shauka Tribe of Middle Himalayas, by Negi Girdhar Singh, Dept. of History, Kumaon University, Nainital. 2006. Lucknow Journal of Social Sciences. 2006, Volume 3, Issue 2. ISSN 0974-8148.

References 
 Travelogue - Munsyari, Of Shaukas, Salt Route and Snow Peaks

Kumaon division
Scheduled Tribes of India
People from Pithoragarh
Social groups of Uttarakhand